Finest is a compilation album by Scottish band The Proclaimers, released in 2003.

Track listing
"I'm Gonna Be (500 Miles)" – 3:39
"Better Days" – 3:13
"Sunshine on Leith" – 5:15
"Leaving Home" – 3:09
"Then I Met You" – 3:49
"A Train Went Past the Window" – 3:14
"Twenty Flight Rock" – 1:55
"Make My Heart Fly" – 2:29
"(I'm Gonna) Burn Your Playhouse Down" – 2:01
"Misty Blue" – 3:35
"Long Black Veil" – 3:03
"Not Ever" – 2:36
"These Arms of Mine" – 3:18
"Shout Shout" – 6:21

The Proclaimers albums
2003 compilation albums